Somatostatin receptor type 5 is a protein that in humans is encoded by the SSTR5 gene.

Somatostatin acts at many sites to inhibit the release of many hormones and other secretory proteins.  The biological effects of somatostatin are probably mediated by a family of G protein-coupled receptors that are expressed in a tissue-specific manner.  SSTR5 is a member of the superfamily of receptors having seven transmembrane segments.

See also
 Somatostatin receptor

References

Further reading

External links

 

G protein-coupled receptors